Madeley Market railway station is a disused railway station in Shropshire, England.

The station was opened by the London and North Western Railway in 1861 on the company's Coalport Branch Line to serve the town of Madeley, Shropshire.  It closed to passengers in 1952, and to freight on 5 December 1960.

References
Notes

Sources

Further reading

External links
Geograph Madeley Market Station

Disused railway stations in Shropshire
Former London and North Western Railway stations
Railway stations in Great Britain closed in 1952
Railway stations in Great Britain opened in 1861
1861 establishments in England